Vogelsang Peak is a peak in the Cathedral Range of Yosemite National Park, located in northeastern Mariposa County, California.

Naming
The peak was named by Col. H.C. Benson in 1907. There is dispute over whether the peak was named for Charles A Vogelsang, an executive officer of California's State Fish and Game Commission from 1896–1901, or his brother Alexander Theodore Vogelsang, who served as president of the California State Board of Fish and Game from 1901-1910. The German word "vogelsang" can be translated as "a meadow in which birds sing".

Topography
Vogelsang Peak's southeastern side is made up of a relatively uniform arc of steep rock. Its northwestern side is a series of cirques and sheer cliffs. Well known climbing routes include the Nightingale Arête (II 5.9) and the West Face (IV 5.10 A2). Vogelsang Pass, Vogelsang Lake and the Vogelsang High Sierra Camp are located northeast of the summit.

References

External links
 

Mountains of Yosemite National Park
Mountains of Mariposa County, California
Mountains of Northern California